Hypsopygia chytriodes is a species of snout moth in the genus Hypsopygia. It was described by Alfred Jefferis Turner in 1911 and is found in Australia.

References

Moths described in 1911
Pyralini